The 2003 Copa Colsanitas was a women's tennis tournament played on outdoor clay courts at the Club Campestre El Rancho in Bogotá, Colombia that was part of Tier III of the 2003 WTA Tour. It was the sixth edition of the tournament and ran from 17 February through 23 February 2003. Fourth-seeded Fabiola Zuluaga won the singles title and earned $27,000 first-prize money.

Finals

Singles

 Fabiola Zuluaga defeated  Anabel Medina Garrigues 6–3, 6–2
 It was Zuluaga's 1st singles title of the year and the 5th of her career.

Doubles

 Katarina Srebotnik /  Åsa Svensson defeated  Tina Križan /  Tatiana Perebiynis 6–2, 6–1

References

External links
 Official website 
 Official website 
 ITF tournament edition details
 Tournament draws

Copa Colsanitas
Copa Colsanitas
2003 in Colombian tennis